Doctor Finlay is a British television series based on A. J. Cronin's stories about the fictional medical hero, Dr. Finlay.

It was first broadcast on 5 March 1993 on ITV.

It is a follow-up to Dr. Finlay's Casebook, the successful BBC series and takes place in the 1940s after John Finlay returns from war service. Early storylines include the setting up of the new National Health Service and the modernisation of the medical practice at Arden House, Tannochbrae, Scotland.

The show stars David Rintoul as Dr. Finlay, Ian Bannen as his semi-retired practice partner, Dr. Cameron, and Annette Crosbie as his housekeeper, Janet. Other central characters include Finlay's assistant, Dr. Neil, played by Jason Flemyng and Finlay's new partner, Dr. Napier, played by Jessica Turner.

The series was a Scottish Television production (now known as STV Productions) that was filmed in Auchtermuchty, Fife, Scotland. It also used the Dumgoyne Peak and Loch Lomond as supposedly local backdrops although these are not close to Auchtermuchty. It aired in the U.S. on PBS' Masterpiece Theatre.

Cast
David Rintoul as Dr. John Finlay
Ian Bannen as Dr. Alexander Cameron
Annette Crosbie as Janet MacPherson
Jason Flemyng as Dr. David Neil
Jessica Turner as Dr. Jennifer Napier
Gordon Reid as Angus Livingstone
Margo Gunn as Brenda Maitland
Jackie Morrison as Rhona Swanson

See also
Dr. Finlay
Dr. Finlay's Casebook (TV & radio)

External links
 (STV Player).
.
.
Doctor Finlay review.
epguides website with a list of episodes.
PBS - Masterpiece Theatre - Doctor Finlay : Part I .
PBS - Masterpiece Theatre - Doctor Finlay : Part II .
Article about Cronin and the NHS.

1990s British drama television series
1993 Scottish television series debuts
1996 Scottish television series endings
ITV television dramas
1990s British medical television series
Period television series
Scottish television shows
Television shows produced by Scottish Television
Television shows based on works by A. J. Cronin
Television series set in the 1940s
Television shows set in Scotland
1990s Scottish television series
English-language television shows